Cristián Undurraga (born October 13, 1954 in Santiago, Chile) is a Chilean architect.

Early life 
He graduated from Pontificia Universidad Católica de Chile in 1977.

Career 
In 1978 he founded Undurraga Deves Studio. Among his foundational works is the ‘House on a Hill’.

In 2009 Undurraga was recognized as Honorary Fellow of the American Institute of Architects.

References

1954 births
Living people
Chilean architects
Pontifical Catholic University of Chile alumni
Chilean people of Basque descent